HIV-associated pruritus is a cutaneous condition, an itchiness of the skin, that occurs in up to 30% of HIV infected people, occurs when the T-cell count drops below 400 per cubic mm.

See also 
 Skin lesion

References 

Virus-related cutaneous conditions